Stempfferia gordoni, the brown black-square epitola, is a butterfly in the family Lycaenidae. The family was first described by Hamilton Herbert Druce in 1903. It is found in Nigeria (east and the Cross River loop), Cameroon, Bioko, Gabon, the Republic of the Congo, the Central African Republic and the Democratic Republic of the Congo. The habitat consists of forests.

References

Butterflies described in 1903
Poritiinae
Butterflies of Africa
Taxa named by Hamilton Herbert Druce